Colma may refer to:

Art, entertainment, and media
Colma (album), 1998, by guitarist Buckethead
Colma: The Musical (2006), an American independent film

Places
Colma, California, a town
Colma (BART station)
Colma Creek, near the San Francisco Bay in California
Monte Colma, a mountain in Liguria, northern Italy